The first inauguration of Theodore Roosevelt as the 26th president of the United States, took place on Saturday, September 14, 1901, at the Ansley Wilcox House, at 641 Delaware Avenue in Buffalo, New York, following the death of President William McKinley earlier that day. The inauguration – the fifth non-scheduled, extraordinary inauguration to ever take place and the first in the 20th century – marked the commencement of the first term (a partial term of ) of Theodore Roosevelt as president. John R. Hazel, U.S. District Judge for the Western District of New York, administered the presidential oath of office.

Background
On September 6, Vice President Roosevelt had been at a luncheon of the Vermont Fish and Game League on Lake Champlain when he learned the news that McKinley had been shot. He rushed to Buffalo, but after being assured the president would recover, he went on a planned family camping and hiking trip to Mount Marcy in the Adirondacks. A week after the shooting, on the mountains, a runner notified him McKinley was on his death bed. Roosevelt pondered with his wife, Edith, how best to respond, not wanting to show up in Buffalo and wait on McKinley's death. Roosevelt was rushed by a series of stagecoaches to North Creek train station. At the station, Roosevelt was handed a telegram that said President McKinley died at 2:15 (September 14) that morning. The new president continued by train from North Creek to Buffalo. He arrived in Buffalo later that morning, accepting an invitation to stay at the home of Ansley Wilcox, a prominent lawyer and friend since the early 1880s when they had both worked closely with then-New York Governor Grover Cleveland on civil service reform.

Ceremony

At 3:00 PM on the afternoon of September 14, several members of President McKinley's cabinet arrived at the Wilcox house (now known as the Theodore Roosevelt Inaugural National Historic Site). They were United States Secretary of War Elihu Root, Secretary of the Navy John D. Long, Attorney General Philander C. Knox, Secretary of the Interior Ethan Hitchcock, Postmaster General Charles Emory Smith, and Secretary of Agriculture James Wilson. With them were Judge Hazel, Judge Albert Haight of the New York Court of Appeals, and United States Senator from New York Chauncey Depew, among others. Roosevelt met with them informally in the Library and, at the last moment, the newspaper men were all let in, but were prohibited from taking any photographs. Then, when asked whether he was ready to take the oath, he answered, "I will take the oath. And in this hour of deep and terrible national bereavement, I wish to state that it shall be my aim to continue, absolutely without variance, the policy of President McKinley, for the peace and honor of our beloved country." After his response, Judge Hazel administered the oath.

Reaction
Expressing the fears of many old-line Republicans, Mark Hanna lamented "that damned cowboy is president now."

See also
Presidency of Theodore Roosevelt
Second inauguration of Theodore Roosevelt
Theodore Roosevelt Inaugural National Historic Site

Notes

References

External links

United States presidential inaugurations
1901 in American politics
Inauguration 1
1901 in New York (state)
History of Buffalo, New York
Assassination of William McKinley
September 1901 events